The New Elizabethans was a 2012 series on BBC Radio 4 to mark the diamond Jubilee of Queen Elizabeth II. A panel of seven academics, journalists and historians, chaired by Chief Executive of the Royal Opera House Tony Hall took suggestions from the general public for people "whose actions during the reign of Elizabeth II have had a significant impact on lives in these islands and given the age its character, for better or worse".

A short piece was written about each of the 60 people selected. These were presented by James Naughtie. The first broadcast was about Edmund Hillary and was first aired at 12:45 p.m. on Monday, 11 June and the series concluded with Queen Elizabeth II on Friday, 7 September 2012.

The list 

Edmund Hillary
Elizabeth David
Graham Greene
Michael Young
Vladimir Raitz
Francis Crick
Doris Lessing
Alan Sainsbury
Alfred Hitchcock
Laurence Olivier
Benjamin Britten
Dorothy Hodgkin
Harold Pinter
Richard Doll
Tony Hancock
Philip Larkin
Barbara Windsor
Lord Denning
Paul Foot
Francis Bacon
John Lennon and Paul McCartney
Margot Fonteyn
Peter Hall
Terence Conran
Enoch Powell
Cicely Saunders
Basil D'Oliveira
George Best
Germaine Greer
Robert Edwards
Jack Jones
Roald Dahl
David Bowie
Talaiasi Labalaba, Fijian-born NCO and member of SAS
Jocelyn Bell Burnell
Roy Jenkins
Vivienne Westwood
Jayaben Desai
Stuart Hall
David Attenborough
Margaret Thatcher
David Hockney
Billy Connolly
Ralph Robins
Amartya Sen
Salman Rushdie
Anita Roddick
Norman Foster
Charles Saatchi
Goldie
John Hume and David Trimble
Doreen Lawrence
Tim Berners-Lee
Diana, Princess of Wales
Alex Salmond
Tony Blair
Fred Goodwin
Rupert Murdoch
Simon Cowell
Queen Elizabeth II

External links 
Homepage on bbc.co.uk

References 

BBC Radio 4 programmes
2012 radio programme debuts